is a Japanese actress and gravure model. She has appeared in more than 20 films since 1988.

Selected filmography

Film

Television

Awards
She won the best actress award at the Tokyo Sports Film Awards for A Snake of June.

References

External links
 

1971 births
Living people
People from Fujisawa, Kanagawa
Japanese actresses
Japanese female adult models